Pequeño is the second album of the solo artist Enrique Bunbury made in 1999. Something different of anything done before by Bunbury, his dream to re-invent himself was accomplished.

Track listing
Algo en común (Something in common)
Infinito (Infinite)
El Extranjero (The foreigner)  
Solo si me perdonas (Only if you forgive me)  
El viento a favor (The right wind)   
Lejos de la tristeza (Far from sadness)
Dudar, quizás (Doubt? Maybe)
Demasiado tarde (Too late)  
De mayor (When I'm older)  
Bailando con el enemigo (Dancing with the enemy) 
Robinson
Contradictorio (Contradictory)

See also
Enrique Bunbury Wikipedia Article
Heroes Del Silencio, Enrique Bunbury band during the 1990s.

References

Enrique Bunbury albums
1999 albums
EMI Records albums